Borgar Høgetveit Berg (born 9 April 1970) is a Norwegian judge, who has served as a Justice of the Supreme Court of Norway since May 2017.

Early life 
Berg was born on 9 April 1970 to Hallgrim Berg and Maria Høgetveit Berg.

Career 
He worked in the Office of the Attorney General of Norway from 1998 to 2005, then as a partner in the law firm Thommessen. He was also acting judge in Borgarting Court of Appeal. He was appointed as a Supreme Court Justice in 2017.

References

1970 births
Living people
Judges from Oslo
Supreme Court of Norway justices